The Chester House Inn, also known as the Chester Inn and the Brick Tavern, is a historic building at the corner of Main Street and Hillside Road in Chester Borough, Morris County, New Jersey. It was built from 1810 to 1812 by Zephaniah Drake. The inn was added to the National Register of Historic Places for its significance in architecture, commerce, and education on July 18, 1974.

Gallery

See also
National Register of Historic Places listings in Morris County, New Jersey

References

External links
 
 
 

		
Chester Borough, New Jersey
Taverns in New Jersey
National Register of Historic Places in Morris County, New Jersey
New Jersey Register of Historic Places
Historic American Buildings Survey in New Jersey
1812 establishments in New Jersey
Brick buildings and structures
Buildings and structures in Morris County, New Jersey
Drinking establishments on the National Register of Historic Places in New Jersey